Prime7's Saturday Club is a morning children's program, filmed in their Australian Capital Territory studios.

Hosted by Prime Possum and Madelaine Collignon, The program is packaged around popular Disney Cartoons airing at 9am on Saturdays. The program has been packaged around Disney Movies.

GWN7's Saturday Club is hosted by Doopa Dog and Madelaine Collignon.

History
Previous hosts have included Aileen Ward, Remi Broadway, Justin Thomson, Noel Brunning, Shauna Willis, Melanie Ross, Alison Joy & Danneeka Teune.

Programming
Cartoons featured in The Saturday Club have included shows such as:
 Brandy & Mr. Whiskers
 The Replacements
 Kim Possible
 Dave The Barbarian
 Teamo Supremo
 The Buzz on Maggie
 The Proud Family
 American Dragon: Jake Long

See also

 GWN7
 Prime7

Prime7 original programming
Australian children's television series
2000s Australian television series